Giovanni Fonio (born 7 May 1998) is an Italian tennis player.

Fonio has a career high ATP singles ranking of 435 achieved on 25 October 2021. He also has a career high doubles ranking of 475 achieved on 10 February 2020.

Fonio has won 1 ATP Challenger doubles title at the 2021 Antalya Challenger III with Riccardo Bonadio.

Challenger and Futures/World Tennis Tour Finals

Singles:7 (4-3)

Doubles: 1 (1-0)

References

External links
 
 

1998 births
Living people
Italian male tennis players
People from Novara
Sportspeople from the Province of Novara
21st-century Italian people